James Sherman Cutsinger (May 4, 1953 – February 19, 2020) was an author, editor, and professor of religious studies (emeritus) at the University of South Carolina, whose works focused primarily on comparative religion, the modern Traditionalist School of perennial philosophy, Eastern Christian spirituality, and the mystical tradition of the Eastern Orthodox Church.

Early life
Cutsinger earned his bachelor's degree in Political Theory, Russian Language and Literature at Cornell College in 1975 and his doctorate in Theology and Religious Thought at Harvard University in 1980.

Traditionalism

Cutsinger served as secretary to the Foundation for Traditional Studies and was a widely recognized authority on the Sophia Perennis, the traditionalist school, and comparative religion – subjects on which he wrote extensively.  His works also focused on the theology and spirituality of the Christian East.  He is perhaps best known however, for his work on Swiss philosopher and traditionalist, Frithjof Schuon.

Teaching
Professor Cutsinger was a professor of Theology and Religious Thought at the University of South Carolina and an advocate of Socratic Teaching. The recipient of three University of South Carolina Mortar Board Excellence in Teaching awards, he was also named a Distinguished Honors Professor and was selected as one of his university's Michael J. Mungo Teachers of the Year (2011). He also served as director of three National Endowment for the Humanities Summer Seminars.

Bibliography

Books
The Form of Transformed Vision: Coleridge and the Knowledge of God, Foreword by Owen Barfield (Mercer University Press, 1987)
Advice to the Serious Seeker: Meditations on the Teaching of Frithjof Schuon (State University of New York Press, 1997)
Reclaiming the Great Tradition: Evangelicals, Catholics, and Orthodox in Dialogue, ed. (InterVarsity Press, 1997)
Not of This World: A Treasury of Christian Mysticism (World Wisdom, 2003)
Paths to the Heart: Sufism and the Christian East (World Wisdom, 2004)
The Fullness of God: Frithjof Schuon on Christianity (World Wisdom, 2004)
Prayer Fashions Man: Frithjof Schuon on the Spiritual Life (World Wisdom, 2005)

Translations of works by Frithjof Schuon
Gnosis: Divine Wisdom (World Wisdom, 2006)
Sufism: Veil and Quintessence (World Wisdom, 2006)
Spiritual Perspectives and Human Facts (World Wisdom, 2007)
Christianity/Islam: Perspectives on Esoteric Ecumenism (World Wisdom, 2008)
Logic and Transcendence (World Wisdom, 2009)

Selected Articles
"Coleridgean Polarity and Theological Vision," Harvard Theological Review, 76:1 (1983)
"Toward a Method of Knowing Spirit," Studies in Religion/Sciences Religieuses, 14:2 (1985)
"Femininity, Hierarchy, and God," Religion of the Heart: Essays Presented to Frithjof Schuon, ed. Nasr and Stoddart (Foundation for Traditional Studies, 1991)
"Listening More Closely to Schuon," ARIES: Association pour la Recherche de l'Information sur l'Esoterisme, 14 (1992)
"A Knowledge that Wounds Our Nature: The Message of Frithjof Schuon," Journal of the American Academy of Religion, 60:3 (1992)
"The Mystery of the Two Natures," Sophia: Journal of Traditional Studies, 4:2 (1998) - also published as "Le Mystère des Deux Natures," Connaissance des Religions (Numero Hors Serie, 1999)
"On Earth as It Is in Heaven: A Metaphysical Cosmogony," Sacred Web: A Journal of Tradition and Modernity," 1:1 (1998)
"The Virgin," Sophia: Journal of Traditional Studies, 6:2 (2000)

See also

Christianity and other religions
Christian mysticism
Christian philosophy
Ecumenism and interfaith dialogue
Esoteric Christianity
Frithjof Schuon
Orthodox Christian theology
Philosophy of religion
Samuel Taylor Coleridge
Sophia Perennis
Traditionalist School

Further reading
Real Audio clips of Hesychia: An Eastern Orthodox Opening to Esoteric Ecumenism (2001 Paths to the Heart Conference)

References

External links
Personal Webpage
James Cutsinger’s life and work

1953 births
2020 deaths
Deaths from lung cancer
20th-century Eastern Orthodox theologians
21st-century Eastern Orthodox theologians
Harvard University alumni
American Christian theologians
Scholars in Eastern Orthodoxy
Traditionalist School
University of South Carolina faculty
Place of birth missing
Eastern Orthodox Christians from the United States
Western esotericism scholars